The 2018 South Sulawesi Gubernatorial Election took place on 27 June 2018 as part of the simultaneous local elections. It was held to elect the governor of South Sulawesi along with their deputy, whilst members of the provincial council (Dewan Perwakilan Rakyat Daerah) will be re-elected in 2019.

Incumbent Syahrul Yasin Limpo was barred from participating in the elections due to a constitutional term limits. Official candidates were sitting Deputy Governor of South Sulawesi Agus Arifin Nu'mang (id), former chairman of PSSI and current Program Coordinator of Golkar Nurdin Halid, Syahrul Yasin Limpo's brother and former Regent of Gowa Regency Ichsan Yasin Limpo (id) and incumbent Regent of Bantaeng Regency Nurdin Abdullah.

Timeline
The election will have a voter count of 6,323,711, spread across 24 cities and regencies in South Sulawesi across over 17,000 polling stations.

Registration for party-backed candidates were opened between 8 and 10 January 2018, while independent candidates were required to register between 22 and 26 November 2017. The campaigning period would commence between 15 February and 24 June, with a three-day election silence before voting on 27 June.

Candidates
The Ichsan Yasin Limpo and Andi Mudzakar pair was the only independent pair in the election, having submitted over 500,000 verified identity cards in comparison to the required 483,514 (7.5 percent of the voter population) although several political parties still declared their support for the ticket.

Candidates backed by political parties are required to have the backing of at least 17 seats in the DPRD (regional council) to run.

Polling

After formal nominations

Before nominations

Results

Quick count 
Unofficial

Official
The following data provides the result of the formal quick count conducted by the National Election Commission (KPU) for the 2018 South Sulawesi Gubernatorial Election. The quick count provided by the National Election Commission (KPU) serves as a basis of information for the people to know the result of the Simultaneous Local Elections held on 27 June 2018 as fast and as transparent as possible. The data which serves as the basis of this formal quick count comes from the C1 Model entries. The formal quick count is a temporary result and is not final. Should there be any errors found in the conducting process of the formal quick count, fixes shall be made in the national recapitulation process. The data provided originates from 16,256 ballot centres from a total of 17,145 ballot centres (94.81%).

References

2018 Indonesian gubernatorial elections
Elections in South Sulawesi